Kalateh-ye Khvosh (also Romanized as Kalāteh-ye Khvosh; also known as Kalāteh-ye Khowshk) is a village in Fariman Rural District, in the Central District of Fariman County, Razavi Khorasan Province, Iran. At the 2006 census, its population was 160, in 36 families.

References 

Populated places in Fariman County